Nicaragua Christian Academy is an ACSI accredited English-language school located in Nicaragua. It is classified as an evangelical, non-denominational, nonprofit preschool, elementary, and secondary educational institution.

Beginnings
NCAI was founded in 1991 by non-Nicaraguan Christian missionary families, with the intention of educating their children in a near-North American atmosphere, aiming for a college preparatory Rprogram and incorporating Christian teachings, emphasizing a personal relationship with Jesus Christ and a life committed to Christian service.

Expansion
SAs the school enrollment grew, NCI expanded in scope. Its original campus, outside Managua, is aligned with the North American school year (August-June), and classes are conducted in English with a daily Spanish lesson. The student body, originally composed of only children of expatriate missionaries, was expanded as resources allowed to include children of local church members who were somewhat fluent in English.

RA second school campus was later established within the city limits of Managua, called Nejapa. Its classes are conducted in Spanish, with a daily English lesson. Its students are drawn from the families of local members, and its schedule is based on the Nicaraguan calendar (February to November).

A third school campus has been established in Matagalpa, Nicaragua, similar to the Nejapa setup. This third campus is known as Matagalpa, and also operates according to the Nicaraguan school year.

Demographics
55 percent of NCAIś students are Nicaraguan, 32 percent are North American, and 10 percent
are Asian. The students represent 18 countries from around the world.

Curriculum
NCA International has a unique curriculum at all levels of the school. It is
based on a US and international school framework with the integration of
Spanish and Nicaraguan social studies classes. NCAI usestextbooks from a variety of
publishers in order to accomplish its curricular goals, including Pearson Education
McGraw-Hill, BJU Press, A Beka, ACSI, and Christian Schools International.

Levels
NCAI is divided into pre-school, primary school and secondary school levels. 
Their pre-school level is composed of 2 Pre-K levels and Kindergarten. It focuses on English learning, so that NCAI's Nicaraguan students can learn English and keep up. NCAI's elementary level is arguably the most important, because it introduces many new subjects to the children at the school. Biblical classes, Science, Language Arts, and Social Studies are taught at this level. Bi-weekly PE classes are taught as well. Secondary school is the final level of NCAI education, and the ultimate goal is to prepare students for college or university.

References

External links
Nicaragua Christian Academy

Schools in Nicaragua
Educational institutions established in 1991
Buildings and structures in Managua
1991 establishments in Nicaragua
Matagalpa Department